United States gubernatorial elections were held in 1920, in 35 states, concurrent with the House, Senate elections and presidential election, on November 2, 1920 (September 13 in Maine).

In Massachusetts, the governor was elected to a two-year term for the first time, instead of a one-year term. Every governorship mirrored the presidential results in their state.

This is the most recent year in which all gubernatorial elections were won by the same party that won the state in the year's presidential election.

Results

See also 
1920 United States elections
1920 United States presidential election
1920 United States Senate elections
1920 United States House of Representatives elections

References

Bibliography 
 
 

 
November 1920 events in the United States